"Whispers" is the second single from freestyle singer Corina's debut album, Corina. Originally recorded by Rianna Paige intended for her album however Sleeping Bag Records folded and the song was then submitted to Corina. It was the last song added the Corina album. Junior Vazquez also did a mash-up in early 2000 with No Doubt's "It's My Life."

Track listing
US 12" single

Charts

References

1991 singles
Corina (singer) songs
Songs written by Peter Zizzo
1991 songs